Sveti Lovreč is a village and municipality in Istria, Croatia. The population is 1,408 (census 2001).

References

External links 

 Tourist info 
 Panoramic of Sveti Lovreč 

Municipalities of Croatia
Populated places in Istria County